Jacques Marinelli (born 15 December 1925) is a French former cyclist. He wore the yellow jersey of leadership for six days in the 1949 Tour de France before finishing third.

Background
The writer Max Favalelli said of Marinelli: "He is a pygmy. His body is no thicker than a propelling pencil, his legs no thicker than runner beans. And his head is like a fist." Marinelli as an adult was 1m 62 tall and wore size 38 shoes. He was so thin and sickly-looking as a boy that his mother urged him to play accordion rather than ride a bike. Marinelli nevertheless raced and came to prominence in the Trophées Peugeot. That brought him selection for the 1948 Tour.

He rode the Tour six times between 1948 and 1954 but finished only in 1949 and in 1952, when he came 31st. He became the first rider in the Tour to write a column for L'Équipe, in 1949.

Budgerigar in yellow

He became known as la perruche during the 1949 Tour. Riding for the regional Ile-de-France team rather than the national team, Marinelli rose above his humble status by attacking repeatedly during the first four days. On the fourth he came second and became race leader, leading a field that included Fausto Coppi and Gino Bartali. He exchanged the green jersey of the Ile-de-France for the yellow of leader. Next morning the organiser, Jacques Goddet, wrote in L'Équipe: "Our budgerigar has been transformed into a canary", a reference to Marinelli's small shape in yellow. The nickname stuck – but "budgerigar" rather than "canary".

Marinelli rode above himself and exploited the rivalry between Coppi and Bartali to keep the lead for another five days, as far as the Pyrenees. Marinelli still has the yellow jersey, although it has been eaten by moths. He said: "For a great champion to wear the yellow jersey, that's normal. But when it's an amateur that's different, and then again my height, I think that's what contributed to my popularity."

Retirement

He stopped racing at 28 to run a cycle shop and then an electrical-goods shop in the place St-Jean at Melun, in Greater Paris. It is still there. He then became director of a branch of Conforama, a furniture chain, in the town and ran a company called Marinelli Connexion, which had 150 employees and ran delivery vehicles painted yellow. His was the largest business in the town. He was given the Prix Jean-Claude Killy in 1986 by the Académie des Sports for his success in starting a new life after sport.

Marinelli was elected mayor of Melun in 1989 and again in 1995. He left office in 2001. He was instrumental in bringing the Tour to his town in 1991 and 1998. In 1991 he rode part of the course for the television station FR3.

Major results

1948
1st place in Hollerich (Lux)
1949
1949 Tour de France
3rd place final classification
6 days in yellow jersey
1950
Dauphiné Libéré: winner of stages 6 and 7
1st Madrid
1st Paris – Montceau-les-Mines
1954
1st Paris – Montceau-les-Mines

References

Further reading

French male cyclists
French Tour de France stage winners
Living people
1925 births
People from Le Blanc-Mesnil
Sportspeople from Seine-Saint-Denis
Cyclists from Île-de-France